Atlantic Cup may refer to:

Atlantic Cup (Major League Soccer), a competition in Major League Soccer
Atlantic Cup (Europe), an association football (soccer) competition between the champions of Iceland and the Faroe Islands
Atlantic Cup (Portugal), a winter association football (soccer) competition between guest European club football teams
, an international tournament for U19 soccer teams held on the island of Gran Canaria, Canary Islands 
Taça do Atlântico, a defunct football tournament in South America
EFAF Atlantic Cup, an American football competition
Rugby League Atlantic Cup, an international rugby league football tournament
Atlantic Alliance Cup, a former Australian rules football competition